James Edward Parker (born 8 September 1842) was an English rower who won several events at Henley Royal Regatta and won the Wingfield Sculls, the amateur sculling championship of the River Thames.

Parker was born at Rothley, Leicestershire the third son of James Parker and his wife Mary Babbington. His father was a barrister and  Vice-Chancellor of the High Court and his mother the daughter of Thomas Babington.   Parker was educated at University College, Oxford. While at Oxford, he was an active rower. In 1862, he was a member of the winning University College crew in the Ladies' Challenge Plate at Henley Royal Regatta. He also competed in the Wingfield Sculls but was runner-up to Walter Bradford Woodgate. In 1863 he was in the University College crews which won the Grand Challenge Cup and the Stewards' Challenge Cup  but he never rowed in the  Oxford eight. In 1863, as a sculler he won the OUBC sculls and the Wingfield Sculls - the latter being a row-over because Woodgate had an injured neck.

References

1842 births
English male rowers
British male rowers
Alumni of University College, Oxford
Year of death missing